Boundary Peak is a mountain in Esmeralda County, Nevada, United States.

Geography
Boundary Peak is the northernmost peak of 13,000 feet or greater elevation within the White Mountains. The summit is located in Esmeralda County of southwestern Nevada, and is within the Boundary Peak Wilderness of the Inyo National Forest. It is less than half a mile (1 km) from the California state line, which is how it derived its name.

By most definitions Boundary Peak, which has a prominence of only , is considered to be a sub-peak of Montgomery Peak.

Boundary Peak is only  taller than Wheeler Peak, which is located in Great Basin National Park, White Pine County in eastern Nevada. By most definitions, Wheeler Peak is the tallest independent mountain within Nevada.

Climbing
This peak is most often climbed from the Nevada side. From there, a climber may scramble the ridge connecting to Montgomery Peak.  It is recommended that the U.S. Forest Service (Inyo National Forest) be contacted so they can provide climbing information.

See also
 
 
 
 List of highest points in Nevada by county
 List of U.S. states by elevation

References

External links

 
 Inyo National Forest: Boundary Peak Wilderness Area.

Mountains of Nevada
White Mountains (California)
Highest points of U.S. states
Inyo National Forest
Mountains of Esmeralda County, Nevada
Mountains of the Great Basin
North American 4000 m summits